Brian Matthew Chase (born October 8, 1981) is an American professional basketball player who last played for Olimpia Basket Matera of the Serie A2 Basket.

College career
Chase played college basketball at Virginia Tech from 1999 to 2003. He averaged 10.9 points, 2.8 rebounds and 1.9 assists per game during his four-year stint with the Virginia Tech Hokies.

Professional career
Chase went undrafted in the 2003 NBA draft. In the 2004–05 season, he joined the American Basketball Association (ABA) team Maryland Nighthawks, where he averaged 18.4 points, 3.6 rebounds and 2.3 assists per game in 13 matches. He began the 2005–06 season with the Gary Steelheads of the Continental Basketball Association (CBA). He then moved to the NBA D-League team Roanoke Dazzle in March 2006. He finished the season with the Nebraska Cranes of the United States Basketball League (USBL). In the 2006–07 season, he signed by the Utah Jazz, but was released during the regular season. Afterward, he joined the Los Angeles D-Fenders, where he averaged 16.2 points, 4 rebounds and 3.8 assists during that season. He was also selected to the NBA D-League All-Star Game.

Before the 2007–08 NBA season, Chase signed with the Miami Heat. However, he moved back to play with the D-Fenders. In March 2008, Chase's transfer to the Turkish Basketball League club Beşiktaş Cola Turka was confirmed.

In the 2008–09 season, Chase continued his European career playing in France for Le Mans Sarthe Basket where he averaged 13.3 points, 3.3 rebounds and 3.2 assists per game in the French Pro A and 12.4 points, 2.9 rebounds and 2.4 assists in 10 matches of the Euroleague. In February 2009, he moved to BC Dynamo Moscow of Russia, and averaged 18.8 points, 4.3 rebounds and 1.3 assists while playing in 4 matches of the Eurocup.

Chase spent entire 2009–10 season in Spain, playing for CB Valladolid and averaged 10.5 points, 1.7 rebounds and 1.2 assists per game.

At the start of the 2010–11 season, he moved to Bosnia and Herzegovina and signed one-year deal with KK Igokea. In January 2013, he signed with Vanoli Cremona in Italy.

On January 24, 2015, he signed with Eisbären Bremerhaven of the Basketball Bundesliga.

References

External links
 Brian Chase at acb.com
 Brian Chase at eurobasket.com
 Brian Chase at fiba.com

1981 births
Living people
African-American basketball players
American expatriate basketball people in Bosnia and Herzegovina
American expatriate basketball people in Croatia
American expatriate basketball people in France
American expatriate basketball people in Germany
American expatriate basketball people in Italy
American expatriate basketball people in Russia
American expatriate basketball people in Spain
American expatriate basketball people in Turkey
Basketball players from Washington, D.C.
BC Dynamo Moscow players
BC Enisey players
Beşiktaş men's basketball players
CB Valladolid players
Eisbären Bremerhaven players
KK Cibona players
Le Mans Sarthe Basket players
Liga ACB players
Los Angeles D-Fenders players
Point guards
Roanoke Dazzle players
Vanoli Cremona players
Virginia Tech Hokies men's basketball players
American men's basketball players
Dunbar High School (Washington, D.C.) alumni
United States Basketball League players
21st-century African-American sportspeople
20th-century African-American people